Ludwig Leitner (February 24, 1940 – March 21, 2013) was a German alpine ski racer and world champion, born in Mittelberg, Austria.

Leitner became a world champion in the combined event in Innsbruck in 1964. He earned world championship bronze medals in the combined event 1962 and 1966.

Leitner competed at the 1960 Winter Olympics, where he finished 4th in slalom. At the 1964 Winter Olympics, he finished 5th in the slalom and 5th in the downhill.

References

External links
 
 
 
 Ludwig Leitner's obituary 

1940 births
2013 deaths
German male alpine skiers
Olympic alpine skiers of West Germany
Alpine skiers at the 1960 Winter Olympics
Alpine skiers at the 1964 Winter Olympics
Alpine skiers at the 1968 Winter Olympics
Olympic alpine skiers of the United Team of Germany
20th-century German people